There are 18 state-designated highways in Chautauqua County, New York, which comprise a combined  of the touring route total mileage in New York. The 18 state highways include 11 state touring routes and seven reference routes. The nationally-assigned US 20 and US 62 also go through the county, as do I-86 and I-90.

Touring routes

NY 5

NY 5 is a major east–west highway in upstate New York that passes through fourteen counties before ending in the state capital of Albany.

NY 5 begins in Chautauqua County at the Pennsylvania state line (into Pennsylvania, the road becomes Pennsylvania Route 5). NY 5 follows the shore of Lake Erie through the county, passing through Ripley, Westfield, Portland, Dunkirk, Sheridan, Silver Creek and Irving before crossing into Erie County.

Lake Erie State Park in Portland is accessible from NY 5.

NY 17

NY 17 is concurrent with I-86 through Chautauqua County, as it is throughout most of the Southern Tier. It extends for a total of  through twelve counties.  of its path is within Chautauqua County. In Chautauqua County, NY 17 passes through Mina, Sherman, North Harmony, Bemus Point, Jamestown, Falconer and Kennedy.

NY 39

NY 39 begins at U.S. Route 20 in Sheridan. It is an east–west highway that extends for a total of  through five Western New York counties.  of its path goes through Chautauqua County. In Chautauqua County, NY 39 passes through Sheridan, Hanover and Forestville.

NY 60

NY 60 begins at U.S. Route 62 in Kiantone. NY 60 passes through Kiantone, Jamestown, Gerry, Charlotte, Cassadaga, Fredonia and Dunkirk.

NY 76

NY 76 begins at an intersection with New York State Route 474 in Clymer. NY 76 passes through Clymer, Sherman and Ripley.

NY 83

NY 83 begins at U.S. Route 62 at the Cattaraugus County line. NY 83 passes through Cherry Creek, Villenova and Arkwright.

NY 322

NY 322 begins at New York State Route 83 in Villenova.

NY 394

NY 394 begins at New York State Route 5 in Westfield. In Chautauqua County, NY 394 passes through Westfield, Mayville, Chautauqua, Lakewood, Jamestown, Falconer and Kennedy.

NY 426

NY 426 begins at the Pennsylvania state line near Clymer, looping through the southwestern corner of the county and re-entering Pennsylvania near Findley Lake, becoming Pennsylvania Route 426 at both ends. NY 426 passes through French Creek and Findley Lake.

NY 430

NY 430 begins at the Pennsylvania state line near Findley Lake. NY 430, also known as the Sen. Jess J. Present Memorial Highway, passes through Findley Lake, Sherman, Mayville, Bemus Point and Jamestown.

NY 474

NY 474 begins at the Pennsylvania state line in French Creek. NY 474 passes through French Creek, Clymer, Panama, Ashville and Lakewood.

Reference routes

NY 950D
New York State Route 950D, also known as Shortman Road, is a reference route in Ripley.

NY 951C
New York State Route 951C was the former designation of Washington Street in Jamestown. Some time in the early 21st century, the east end of Route 430 was rerouted onto Washington Street, eliminating the 951C designation.

NY 952H
New York State Route 952H, also known as Center Street, is a reference route in Silver Creek. It is just  in length, providing a connection between New York State Route 5 and U.S. Route 20.

NY 952P
New York State Route 952P, also known as Forest Avenue Extension, is a reference route in Busti.

NY 953B
New York State Route 953B, also known as Strunk Road, is a reference route in Ellicott.

NY 954J

New York State Route 954J is a reference route that serves as an I-86 access road near Bemus Point.

NY 954K
New York State Route 954K is a reference route in Jamestown.

See also

References

State highways
Chautauqua County
Transportation in Chautauqua County, New York